Nalek Korbaj (born 8 October 1995) is a Venezuelan boxer. He competed in the men's light heavyweight event at the 2020 Summer Olympics.

References

External links
 

1995 births
Living people
Venezuelan male boxers
Olympic boxers of Venezuela
Boxers at the 2020 Summer Olympics
Pan American Games bronze medalists for Venezuela
Pan American Games medalists in boxing
Boxers at the 2019 Pan American Games
Medalists at the 2019 Pan American Games
People from Mérida, Mérida
21st-century Venezuelan people